Tenuibacillus halotolerans is a Gram-positive, moderately halotolerant and rod-shaped bacterium from the genus of Tenuibacillus which has been isolated from soil from a salt lake from the Xinjiang Province.

References

Bacillaceae
Bacteria described in 2021